Nicholas George Politis  (born 1944) is an Australian businessman and chairman of the Sydney Roosters in the National Rugby League (NRL) competition. Politis is also responsible for the first sponsor on a professional rugby league team's jersey.

Early life
Politis was born in Kythira, Greece. In the late 1940s, Politis and his family immigrated to Australia, settling in Ipswich, Queensland. The family moved to the town of Blackall, living there for a number of years before returning to Ipswich. Politis attended Ipswich Grammar School for his final four years of high school, graduating in 1962. In 1964, he graduated from the University of Queensland.

Business interests
Politis ran and expanded WFM Motors Pty Ltd from March 1974, rebranding its marketing name as City Ford and transforming it into one of the largest Ford dealerships in Australia. The business has been sponsors of the Roosters since 1976, when the club set a new precedent of having major sponsors' names appearing on their jerseys – making Politis the first sponsor in rugby league. As controlling shareholder of Australian Health Care Ltd., he was responsible for its failed sorties into the Australian hospital market, including the celebrated LaTrobe Regional Hospital fiasco, where tens of millions were lost in disastrous contract management.

In March 2014, Politis' NGP Investments (No.2) purchased Barloworld's Australian car sales business for $130 million.

In 2016, Politis sold the site of his Thomson Ford business in Parramatta to property developer Dyldham for an estimated $70 million.

Sydney Roosters
Since 1993, Politis has been the chairman of the Sydney Roosters. After the Roosters won the 2002 NRL Grand Final, he joined the players in getting a premiership logo tattooed on his arm. He has been described as being ranked "among the most powerful, influential and ruthless figures in rugby league since taking over as Roosters chairman". Politis is sometimes affectionately known as "The Godfather" or "Uncle Nick".

Politis was responsible for getting Sonny Bill Williams to return to rugby league with the Roosters after his five-year ban from the NRL, for walking-out on the Bulldogs mid-season in 2008, expired in 2013. Politis reportedly made a handshake agreement with Williams to this effect years prior. According to prominent player agent, Sam Ayoub, "there’s no doubt Sonny would not have returned to the NRL if not for Nick Politis." That year, the Roosters achieved the trifecta of winning the minor premiership, NRL premiership and World Club Challenge.

Politis was chairman when the Roosters won back-to-back premierships in 2018 and 2019.

Personal life
His father was a vet in his homeland of Greece, before moving to Australia. Politis is a member of the Greek-Australian Sports Hall of Fame. In 2014, Politis was appointed a Member of the Member of the Order of Australia (AM) for significant service to rugby league football as an administrator.

Net worth 
In 2010 BRW magazine estimated Politis' net worth at 182 million. As of 2013, it was estimated at more than 200 million, with business turn-over of 4 billion annually. In 2014, BRW assessed Politis' net worth at 410 million. In 2016, Politis' net worth was listed at 594 million, ranked 86th on the BRW Rich 200. Rebranded as the Financial Review Rich List, in 2021 Politis' net worth was assessed at 2.02 billion.

See also
List of NRL club owners

References

Sydney Roosters
Living people
1944 births
Greek emigrants to Australia
Australian rugby league administrators
Rugby league chairmen and investors
Members of the Order of Australia
Australian billionaires
Australian people of Greek descent
Businesspeople from Queensland